David Michael Boyes (born August 26, 1964) is a retired rower from Canada. He won the silver medal at the 1996 Summer Olympics in the Men's Lightweight Coxless Fours, alongside Brian Peaker, Jeffrey Lay, and Gavin Hassett. Boyes was born in St. Catharines, Ontario, and is currently a captain in the St. Catharines Fire Department.

References

1964 births
Living people
Canadian male rowers
Olympic medalists in rowing
Olympic rowers of Canada
Olympic silver medalists for Canada
Rowers at the 1996 Summer Olympics
Rowers from St. Catharines
Medalists at the 1996 Summer Olympics